Fredericksburg School District may refer to:
 Fredericksburg Independent School District, Texas
 Fredericksburg Community School District, Iowa (merged)